is a Japanese Nippon Professional Baseball player for the Yomiuri Giants in Japan's Central League.

See also 

 List of people from Tochigi Prefecture

External links

1983 births
Japanese baseball players
Living people
Nippon Professional Baseball infielders
Baseball people from Tochigi Prefecture
Yomiuri Giants players